Richard Allsop (10 June 1849 – 20 March 1908) was an English cricketer who played for Derbyshire County Cricket Club between 1872 and 1874.

Allsop was born at Wirksworth, Derbyshire, the son of Samuel Allsop, a journeyman joiner, and his wife Ann. By 1871, he was a joiner himself, living with the family at St John Street. He played club cricket for Wirksworth and Burton Cricket Clubs before making his first-class debut for Derbyshire in the 1872 season against Lancashire. He played two further first-class matches for the county in the 1874 season as well as making non-first-class appearances for the side.

Allsop died at Burton-on-Trent in Staffordshire in 1908 at the age of 68.

References

External links

1849 births
1908 deaths
English cricketers
Derbyshire cricketers
People from Wirksworth
Cricketers from Derbyshire